The Haskell Cabal (common architecture for building applications and libraries)  aids in the packaging and distribution of software packages. It is contained in the Haskell Platform.

History
Cabal has been introduced to simplify packaging of Haskell software and modules. It was added to the Glasgow Haskell Compiler version 6.4 as default package manager,  along GHC's internal manager ghc-pkg. The actual binary cabal and the library Cabal are developed in different packages.

Throughout its development it has gained additional features, such as sandboxes, which allow to escape the so-called Cabal hell (see below).

Use
Cabal packages provide a standard set of metadata and build process; thus, it is possible to develop tools to upload Cabal packages to the CPAN-like community repository of software, Hackage, or even allow for automated downloading, compilation, and installation of desired packages from Hackage.

Criticism
Cabal previously used a global package repository by default, version conflicts in dependencies could lead to Cabal hell, a state where certain packages couldn't get installed without re-installing already existing ones and therefore breaking the other packages.

In 2014, a more stable (but less bleeding edge) variant of Hackage called Stackage was created.
 In 2015, it was extended with Haskell LTS and the tool stack, which doesn't share its problems.

Cabal v3 was released in 2019. A new build style resolves the hell in a manner similar to the Nix package manager.

References

External links

 
 "The Haskell Cabal: A Common Architecture for Building Applications and Tools" -(the original proposal and specification, by Isaac Jones, Simon Peyton Jones, Simon Marlow, Malcolm Wallace, and Ross Patterson; a version was submitted to the Haskell Workshop, 2005)
 Cabal talk -(slides)

Free software programmed in Haskell
Free package management systems